People with epilepsy may be classified into different syndromes based on specific clinical features. These features include the age at which seizures begin, the seizure types, and EEG findings, among others. Identifying an epilepsy syndrome is useful as it helps determine the underlying causes as well as deciding what anti-seizure medication should be tried.
Epilepsy syndromes are more commonly diagnosed in infants and children. Some examples of epilepsy syndromes include benign rolandic epilepsy (2.8 per 100,000), childhood absence epilepsy (0.8 per 100,000) and juvenile myoclonic epilepsy (0.7 per 100,000). Severe syndromes with diffuse brain dysfunction caused, at least partly, by some aspect of epilepsy, are also referred to as epileptic encephalopathies. These are associated with frequent seizures that are resistant to treatment and severe cognitive dysfunction, for instance Lennox-Gastaut syndrome and West syndrome.

Classification of Epilepsy syndromes 
Epilepsy syndromes are classified as per the age onset.

Epilepsies with onset in childhood are a complex group of diseases with a variety of causes and characteristics. Some people have no obvious underlying neurological problems or metabolic disturbances. They may be associated with variable degrees of intellectual disability, elements of autism, other mental disorders, and motor difficulties. Others have underlying inherited metabolic diseases, chromosomal abnormalities, specific eye, skin and nervous system features, or malformations of cortical development. Some of these epilepsies can be categorized into the traditional epilepsy syndromes. Furthermore, a variety of clinical syndromes exist of which the main feature is not epilepsy but which are associated with a higher risk of epilepsy. For instance between 1 and 10% of those with Down syndrome and 90% of those with Angelman syndrome have epilepsy.

In general, genetics is believed to play an important role in epilepsies by a number of mechanisms. Simple and complex modes of inheritance have been identified for some of them. However, extensive screening has failed to identify many single rare gene variants of large effect. In the epileptic encephalopathies, de novo mutagenesis appear to be an important mechanism. De novo means that a child is affected, but the parents do not have the mutation. De novo mutations occur in eggs and sperms or at a very early stage of embryonic development. In Dravet syndrome a single affected gene was identified.

Syndromes in which causes are not clearly identified are difficult to match with categories of the current classification of epilepsy. Categorization for these cases is made somewhat arbitrarily. The idiopathic (unknown cause) category of the 2011 classification includes syndromes in which the general clinical features and/or age specificity strongly point to a presumed genetic cause. Some childhood epilepsy syndromes are included in the unknown cause category in which the cause is presumed genetic, for instance benign rolandic epilepsy. Others are included in symptomatic despite a presumed genetic cause (in at least in some cases), for instance Lennox-Gastaut syndrome. Clinical syndromes in which epilepsy is not the main feature (e.g. Angelman syndrome) were categorized symptomatic but it was argued to include these within the category idiopathic. Classification of epilepsies and particularly of epilepsy syndromes will change with advances in research.

Autosomal dominant nocturnal frontal lobe epilepsy
Autosomal dominant nocturnal frontal lobe epilepsy (ADNFLE) is an idiopathic localization-related epilepsy that is an inherited epileptic disorder that causes seizures during sleep. Onset is usually in childhood. These seizures arise from the frontal lobes and consist of complex motor movements, such as hand clenching, arm raising/lowering, and knee bending. Vocalizations such as shouting, moaning, or crying are also common. ADNFLE is often misdiagnosed as nightmares. ADNFLE has a genetic basis. These genes encode various nicotinic acetylcholine receptors.

Rolandic epilepsy
Benign centrotemporal lobe epilepsy of childhood or benign Rolandic epilepsy is an idiopathic localization-related epilepsy that occurs in children between the ages of 3 and 13 years, with peak onset in prepubertal late childhood. Apart from their seizure disorder, these patients are otherwise normal. This syndrome features simple focal seizures that involve facial muscles and frequently cause drooling. Although most episodes are brief, seizures sometimes spread and generalize. Seizures are typically nocturnal and confined to sleep. The EEG may demonstrate spike discharges that occur over the centrotemporal scalp over the central sulcus of the brain (the Rolandic sulcus) that are predisposed to occur during drowsiness or light sleep. Seizures cease near puberty. Seizures may require anticonvulsant treatment, but sometimes are infrequent enough to allow physicians to defer treatment.

Benign occipital epilepsy of childhood

Benign occipital epilepsy of childhood (BOEC) is an idiopathic localization-related epilepsy and consists of an evolving group of syndromes. Most authorities include two subtypes, an early subtype with onset between three and five years, and a late onset between seven and 10 years. Seizures in BOEC usually feature visual symptoms such as scotoma or fortifications (brightly colored spots or lines) or amaurosis (blindness or impairment of vision). Convulsions involving one half the body, hemiconvulsions, or forced eye deviation or head turning are common. Younger patients typically experience symptoms similar to migraine with nausea and headache, and older patients typically complain of more visual symptoms. The EEG in BOEC shows spikes recorded from the occipital (back of head) regions. The EEG and genetic pattern suggest an autosomal dominant transmission as described by Ruben Kuzniecky, et al. Lately, a group of epilepsies termed Panayiotopoulos syndrome that share some clinical features of BOEC.

Childhood absence epilepsy
Childhood absence epilepsy (CAE) is a genetic generalized epilepsy that affects children between the ages of 4 and 12 years of age, although peak onset is around five to six years old. These patients have recurrent absence seizures, brief episodes of unresponsive staring, sometimes with minor motor features such as eye blinking or subtle chewing. The EEG finding in CAE is generalized 3 Hz spike and wave discharges. Some go on to develop generalized tonic-clonic seizures. This condition carries a good prognosis because children do not usually show cognitive decline or neurological deficits, and the seizures in the majority cease spontaneously with ongoing maturation.

Dravet syndrome
Dravet syndrome, previously known as severe myoclonic epilepsy of infancy (SMEI), is a neurodevelopmental disorder beginning in infancy and characterized by severe epilepsy that does not respond well to treatment. This syndrome was described by Charlotte Dravet, French psychiatrist and epileptologist (born July 14, 1936). Dravet described this syndrome while working at the Centre Saint Paul at the University of Marseille. At Centre Saint Paul, one of her supervisors was Henri Gastaut, who described the Lennox-Gastaut syndrome. She described this condition in 1978 Estimates of the prevalence of this rare disorder have ranged from 1:20,000 to 1:40,000 births, though the incidence may be found to be greater as the syndrome becomes better recognized and new genetic evidence is discovered. It is thought to occur with similar frequency in both genders, and knows no geographic or ethnic boundaries. The course of Dravet syndrome is highly variable from person to person. Seizures begin during the first year of life and development is normal before their onset. In most cases, the first seizures occur with fever and are generalized tonic-clonic (grand mal) or unilateral (one-sided) convulsions. These seizures are often prolonged, and may lead to status epilepticus, a medical emergency. In time, seizures increase in frequency and begin to occur without fever. Additional seizure types appear, most often these are myoclonic, atypical absence, and focal seizures. Additional features that are seen in significant numbers of patients with Dravet syndrome may include sensory processing disorders and other autism spectrum characteristics, orthopedic or movement disorders, frequent or chronic upper respiratory and ear infections, sleep disturbance, dysautonomia, and problems with growth and nutrition.

Epilepsy in females with mental retardation
Epilepsy in females with intellectual disability, is characterized by seizure onset in infancy or early childhood (6–36 months) and cognitive impairment in some cases. Seizures are predominantly generalized, including tonic-clonic, tonic and atonic seizures. The spectrum of phenotypes has been extended to include female patients with early onset epileptic encephalopathies resembling Dravet syndrome, FIRES, Generalized epilepsy with febrile seizures plus (GEFS+) or focal epilepsy with or without intellectual disability. The condition is caused by mutations in PCDH19 (protocadherin 19).

Febrile infection-related epilepsy syndrome
Febrile infection-related epilepsy syndrome (FIRES)

Frontal lobe epilepsy
Frontal lobe epilepsy, usually a symptomatic or cryptogenic localization-related epilepsy, arises from lesions causing seizures that occur in the frontal lobes of the brain. These epilepsies can be difficult to diagnose because the symptoms of seizures can easily be confused with nonepileptic spells and, because of limitations of the EEG, be difficult to "see" with standard scalp EEG.
Juvenile absence epilepsy is an idiopathic generalized epilepsy with later onset than CAE, typically in prepubertal adolescence, with the most frequent seizure type being absence seizures. Generalized tonic-clonic seizures can occur. Often, 3 Hz spike-wave or multiple spike discharges can be seen on EEG. The prognosis is mixed, with some patients going on to a syndrome that is poorly distinguishable from JME.

Juvenile myoclonic epilepsy
Juvenile myoclonic epilepsy (JME) is a genetic generalised epilepsy that occurs in patients aged 8 to 20 years. Patients have normal cognition and are otherwise neurologically intact. The most common seizure is myoclonic jerks, although generalized tonic-clonic seizures and absence seizures may occur as well. Myoclonic jerks usually cluster in the early morning after awakening. The EEG reveals generalized 4–6 Hz spike wave discharges or multiple spike discharges. These patients are often first diagnosed when they have their first generalized tonic-clonic seizure later in life, when they experience sleep deprivation (e.g., freshman year in college after staying up late to study for exams). Alcohol withdrawal can also be a major contributing factor in breakthrough seizures, as well. The risk of the tendency to have seizures is lifelong; however, the majority have well-controlled seizures with anticonvulsant medication and avoidance of seizure precipitants.

Lennox-Gastaut syndrome
Lennox-Gastaut syndrome (LGS) is a generalized epilepsy that consists of a triad of developmental delay or childhood dementia, mixed generalized seizures, and EEG demonstrating a pattern of approximately 2 Hz "slow" spike-waves. Onset occurs between two and 18 years.

Epilepsy is considered a chronic (meaning it lasts for a long time) condition that is defined by seizures. Lennox-Gastaut syndrome (LGS) is a rare and severe form of epilepsy.

As in West syndrome, LGS result from idiopathic, symptomatic, or cryptogenic causes, and many patients first have West syndrome. Authorities emphasize different seizure types as important in LGS, but most have astatic seizures (drop attacks), tonic seizures, tonic-clonic seizures, atypical absence seizures, and sometimes, focal seizures. Anticonvulsants are usually only partially successful in treatment.

Ohtahara syndrome
Ohtahara syndrome is a rare but severe epilepsy syndrome usually starting in the first few days or weeks of life. The seizures are often in the form of stiffening spasms but other seizures including unilateral ones may be seen. The electroencephalogram (EEG) is characteristic. The prognosis is poor with about half of the infants dying in the first year of life; most if not all surviving infants are severely intellectually disabled and many have cerebral palsy. There is no effective treatment. A number of children have underlying structural brain abnormalities.

Reflex epilepsies
About 6% of those with epilepsy have seizures that are often triggered by specific events, known as reflex seizures. A number of epilepsy syndromes, known as reflex epilepsies, have seizures that are only triggered by specific stimuli. Common triggers include: flashing lights and sudden noises.

Those with photosensitive epilepsy can have seizures triggered by flashing lights. Other precipitants can trigger an epileptic seizure in patients who otherwise would be susceptible to spontaneous seizures. For example, children with childhood absence epilepsy may be susceptible to hyperventilation. In fact, flashing lights and hyperventilation are activating procedures used in clinical EEG to help trigger seizures to aid diagnosis. Finally, other precipitants can facilitate, rather than obligately trigger, seizures in susceptible individuals. Emotional stress, sleep deprivation, sleep itself, heat stress, alcohol and febrile illness are examples of precipitants cited by patients with epilepsy. Notably, the influence of various precipitants varies with the epilepsy syndrome. Likewise, the menstrual cycle in women with epilepsy can influence patterns of seizure recurrence. Catamenial epilepsy is the term denoting seizures linked to the menstrual cycle.

Primary reading epilepsy is a reflex epilepsy classified as an idiopathic localization-related epilepsy. Reading in susceptible individuals triggers characteristic seizures.
Catamenial epilepsy (CE) is when seizures cluster around certain phases of a woman's menstrual cycle.
 Pyridoxine-dependent epilepsy

Progressive myoclonic epilepsies
Progressive myoclonic epilepsies define a group of symptomatic generalized epilepsies characterized by progressive dementia and myoclonic seizures. Tonic-clonic seizures may occur as well. Diseases usually classified in this group are Unverricht-Lundborg disease, myoclonus epilepsy with ragged red fibers (MERRF syndrome), Lafora disease, neuronal ceroid lipofucinosis, and sialdosis.

Rasmussen's encephalitis
Rasmussen's encephalitis is a symptomatic localization-related epilepsy that is a progressive, inflammatory lesion affecting children with onset before the age of 10. Seizures start as separate focal seizures and may progress to epilepsia partialis continua (simple partial status epilepticus). Neuroimaging shows inflammatory encephalitis on one side of the brain that may spread if not treated. Dementia and hemiparesis are other problems. The cause is hypothesized to involve an immulogical attack against glutamate receptors, a common neurotransmitter in the brain.

Temporal lobe epilepsy
Temporal lobe epilepsy (TLE) is not a classic syndrome but mentioned here because it is the most common epilepsy of adults. It is a symptomatic localization-related epilepsy and in most cases the epileptogenic region is found in the midline (mesial) temporal structures (e.g., the hippocampus, amygdala, and parahippocampal gyrus). Seizures begin in late childhood and adolescence. Most of these patients have focal seizures sometimes preceded by an aura, and some TLE patients also have secondary generalized tonic-clonic seizures. Often seizures do not sufficiently respond to medical treatment with anticonvulsants and epilepsy surgery may be considered.

West syndrome
West syndrome is a triad of developmental delay, seizures termed infantile spasms, and EEG demonstrating a pattern termed hypsarrhythmia. Onset occurs between three months and two years, with peak onset between eight and nine months. West syndrome may arise from idiopathic, symptomatic, or cryptogenic causes. The most common cause is tuberous sclerosis. The prognosis varies with the underlying cause. In general, most surviving patients remain with significant cognitive impairment and continuing seizures and may evolve to another eponymic syndrome, Lennox-Gastaut syndrome. It can be classified as idiopathic, syndromic, or cryptogenic depending on cause and can arise from both focal or generalized epileptic lesions.

See also
 Management of drug-resistant epilepsy

References

Epilepsy
Syndromes